Hang Dong may refer to

Hang Dong District, Chiang Mai Province, Thailand
Hang Dong, Hang Dong, a town and subdistrict (tambon) in said district
Hang Dong, Hot, a subdistrict in Hot District, Chiang Mai Province, Thailand
Hang-dong, a neighbourhood in Seoul, South Korea